Perti may refer to:

People 
 a family name originating in Italy
Giacomo Antonio Perti, an Italian Baroque composer
Giovanni Pietro Perti, a Baroque architect and sculptor who had worked in the Grand Duchy of Lithuania

Places
Perti, fraction of the municipality (comune) of Finale Ligure, in the Province of Savona, Italy

Organizations
the Islamic Education Movement (Pergerakan Tarbijah Islamijah), a defunct political party in Indonesia

Surnames